In statistical mechanics and mathematics, the Bethe lattice (also called a regular tree) is an infinite connected cycle-free graph where all vertices have the same number of neighbors. The Bethe lattice was introduced into the physics literature by Hans Bethe in 1935. In such a graph, each node is connected to z neighbors; the number z is called either the coordination number or the degree, depending on the field.

Due to its distinctive topological structure, the statistical mechanics of lattice models on this graph are often easier to solve than on other lattices. The solutions are related to the often used Bethe approximation for these systems.

Basic Properties 
When working with the Bethe lattice, it is often convenient to mark a given vertex as the root, to be used as a reference point when considering local properties of the graph.

Sizes of Layers 
Once a vertex is marked as the root, we can group the other vertices into layers based on their distance from the root.

In statistical mechanics 
The Bethe lattice is of interest in statistical mechanics mainly because lattice models on the Bethe lattice are often easier to solve than on other lattices, such as the two-dimensional square lattice. This is because the lack of cycles removes some of the more complicated interactions. While the Bethe lattice does not as closely approximate the interactions in physical materials as other lattices, it can still provide useful insight.

Exact solutions to the Ising model 
The Ising model is a mathematical model of ferromagnetism, in which the magnetic properties of a material are represented by a "spin" at each node in the lattice, which is either +1 or -1. The model is also equipped with a constant  representing the strength of the interaction between adjacent nodes, and a constant  representing an external magnetic field.

The Ising model on the Bethe lattice is defined by the partition function

Magnetization 
In order to compute the local magnetization, we can break the lattice up into several identical parts by removing a vertex. This gives us a recurrence relation which allows us to compute the magnetization of a Cayley tree with n shells (the finite analog to the Bethe lattice) as

where  and the values of  satisfy the recurrence relation

In the  case when the system is ferromagnetic, the above sequence converges, so we may take the limit to evaluate the magnetization on the Bethe lattice. We get

There are either 1 or 3 solutions to this equation. In the case where there are 3, the sequence  will converge to the smallest when  and the largest when .

Free energy 
The free energy f at each site of the lattice in the Ising Model is given by

,

In mathematics

Return probability of a random walk 
We have the recurrence relation

for all , as at each location other than the starting vertex there are  edges going away from the starting vertex and 1 edge going towards it. Summing this equation over all , we get

.

We have , as this indicates that we have just returned to the starting vertex, so , which is the value we want.

Note that this in stark contrast to the case of random walks on the two-dimensional square lattice, which famously has a return probability of 1. Such a lattice is 4-regular, but the 4-regular Bethe lattice has a return probability of 1/3.

Number of closed walks 
One can easily bound the number of closed walks of length  starting at a given vertex of the Bethe Lattice with degree  from below. By considering each step as either an outward step (away from the starting vertex) or an inward step (toward the starting vertex), we see that any closed walk of length  must have exactly  outward steps and  inward steps. We also may not have taken more inward steps than outward steps at any point, so the number of sequences of step directions (either inward or outward) is given by the th Catalan number . There are at least  choices for each outward step, and always exactly 1 choice for each inward step, so the number of closed walks is at least .

This bound is not tight, as there are actually  choices for an outward step from the starting vertex, which happens at the beginning and any number of times during the walk.  The exact number of walks is trickier to compute, and is given by the formula

where  is the Gauss hypergeometric function.

We may use this fact to bound the second largest eigenvalue of a -regular graph. Let  be a -regular graph with  vertices, and let  be its adjacency matrix. Then  is the number of closed walks of length .

This gives .

Relation to Cayley graphs and Cayley trees 

A Bethe graph of even coordination number 2n is isomorphic to the unoriented Cayley graph of a free group of rank n with respect to a free generating set.

Lattices in Lie groups 
Bethe lattices also occur as the discrete subgroups of certain hyperbolic Lie groups, such as the Fuchsian groups. As such, they are also lattices in the sense of a lattice in a Lie group.

See also
Crystal

References

 
 

Lattice models
Trees (graph theory)